Bhandaripokhari is a Vidhan Sabha constituency of Bhadrak district, Odisha.

Area of this constituency includes Bhandaripokhari block and Bonth block.

Elected Members

11 elections held during 1974 to 2014 including a by election in 1991. Elected members from the Bhandaripokhari constituency are:

2014: (43): Prafulla Samal (BJD)
2009: (43): Prafulla Samal (BJD)
2004: (18): Ananta Sethi (Congress)
2000: (18): Ratha Das (BJD)
1998: (By poll): Kumarashri Chiranjib (Congress)
1995: (18): Arjun Charan Sethi (Janata Dal)
1991: (By poll): P. K. Jena (Janata Dal)
1990: (18): Arjun Charan Sethi (Janata Dal)
1985: (18): Panchanan Mandal (Congress)
1980: (18): Purusottam Sethi  (Congress-I)
1977: (18): Kapila Charan Sethi (Janata Party)
1974: (18): Bairagi Jena (Utkal Congress)

2014 Election Result
In 2014 election, Biju Janata Dal candidate Prafulla Samal defeated Indian National Congress candidate Subrat Kumar Das by a margin of 34,097 votes.

Summary of results of the 2009 Election

Notes

References

Assembly constituencies of Odisha
Bhadrak district